Kibitsu Jinja is another name for the Kibitsu Shrine, a Shinto shrine in Okayama. Kibitsu jinja may also refer to

Kibitsu jinja (Bingo), the chief Shinto shrine of Bingo Province
Kibitsuhiko jinja, the chief Shinto shrine of Bizen Province